Arafat Khan (born 27 December 1996) is an Indian cricketer. He made his first-class debut on 4 February 2020, for Rajasthan in the 2019–20 Ranji Trophy. He made his List A debut on 27 February 2021, for Rajasthan in the 2020–21 Vijay Hazare Trophy.

References

External links
 

1996 births
Living people
Indian cricketers
Rajasthan cricketers
Place of birth missing (living people)